Miss Colombia 2001, the 67th Miss Colombia pageant, was held in Cartagena de Indias, Colombia, on November 12, 2001, after three weeks of events.  The winner of the pageant was Vanessa Alexandra Mendoza Bustos, Miss Chocó.

The pageant was broadcast live on RCN TV from the Centro de Convenciones Julio Cesar Turbay in Cartagena de Indias, Colombia. At the conclusion of the final night of competition, outgoing titleholder Andrea Maria Noceti crowned Vanessa Alexandra Mendoza Bustos of Chocó as the new Miss Colombia.

Results

Placements

Delegates 
The Miss Colombia 2001 delegates are:

Antioquia - Isabel Cristina Estrada Cano
Atlántico -  Johanna Cure Lemus
Bogotá D.C. -  Diana Maria Quimbay Valencia
Bolívar -  Andrea Margarita Álvarez Vásquez
Caldas - Cristina Arango Londoño
Cartagena DT y C - Paola Carolina Turbay Haddad
Cesar - Lina Margarita Trujillo Baute
Chocó - Vanessa Alexandra Mendoza Bustos
Córdoba - Rossana Zuleta Bechara
Cundinamarca - Andrea Paola Garzón Gutiérrez
Guajira - María Alejandra Ariza Cuello
Huila - Juanita Martínez Bahamón
Meta - Diana Marcela Quintero Morales
Norte de Santander - Myriam Cecilia Wilches Durán
Quindío - Johanna Andrea Acosta Martínez
San Andrés and Providencia -  Jackeline Suzette Howard Pardo
Santander - Maria Claudia Peñuela Cortejo
Sucre -  María Carolina Amador Vergara
Tolima - Diana Carolina Restrepo Chinchilla
Valle - Consuelo Guzmán Parra
Vichada - Linda Carolina Osorio Bustos

References and footnotes

External links
Official site

Miss Colombia
2001 in Colombia
2001 beauty pageants